Paul Ottar Satre (September 9, 1908 – July 5, 1984) was an American ski jumper and cross-country skier

Paul Ottar Sætre was born at Trysil in Hedmark,  Norway and emigrated to the United States. Between 1930 and 1935 he won 17 skiing meets. He competed in Nordic combined at the 1936 Winter Olympics in Garmisch-Partenkirchen. He was a brother of Karl Magnus Satre. He retired from competitive skiing in 1950. He was inducted into the National Ski Hall of Fame during 1971. He died in  Lakeville, CT during 1984.

References

1908 births
1984 deaths
People from Trysil
Norwegian emigrants to the United States
American male ski jumpers
American male cross-country skiers
American male Nordic combined skiers
Olympic Nordic combined skiers of the United States
Nordic combined skiers at the 1936 Winter Olympics